The Islamic Republic of Iran Navy (IRIN), officially abbreviated NEDAJA, is the naval warfare service branch of Iran's regular military, the Islamic Republic of Iran Army (Artesh). It is one of Iran's two maritime military branches, alongside the Navy of the Islamic Revolutionary Guard Corps (IRGC).

NEDAJA is charged with forming Iran's first line of defense in the Gulf of Oman, Persian Gulf and abroad. It is generally considered to be a conventional green-water navy, as it mostly operates regionally, namely in the Red Sea, Mediterranean Sea, and northwest quarter of the Indian Ocean. The Navy aims to develop blue-water capabilities: in July 2016, it announced plans to establish a presence in the Atlantic Ocean, and as of May 2021 has sent ships into the region.

NEDAJA shares many functions and responsibilities with the IRGC Navy, with distinctions in military strategy and equipment: In contrast to the IRGC Navy, which is equipped with small fast-attack craft, the backbone of the Artesh naval inventory consists of larger surface ships, including frigates and corvettes, and submarines.

The Artesh Navy has a large fleet by the standards of the developing world, and has been described as maintaining "robust" capabilities by regional standards. Since 2019, the Navy has had several joint exercises with Russia and China, which it aims to conduct annually.

History and overview 
 

An Iranian navy in one form or another has existed since Achaemenid times and the First Persian Empire around 500 BC. The Islamic Republic of Iran Navy came into being when the former Imperial Iranian Navy (IIN) of the Pahlavi Era was renamed following the Iranian Revolution in 1979.

1939–1979 

The Iranian navy was rebuilt after being almost completely destroyed during the Anglo-Soviet invasion of Iran in World War II. Following World War II, the fleet began replacing destroyed warships with destroyers, frigates and many smaller vessels, including powerboats and hovercraft, many of which originated from the US and UK, which had played a part in destroying much of the original equipment in World War II. In the 1970s, Iran planned to extend its naval reach into the Indian Ocean; but this goal was curtailed by the Islamic Revolution (1979), and the ensuing western-backed first Persian Gulf War (Iran–Iraq War) (1980–1988) which left it hampered in the face of the invasion.
 
Mohammad Reza Pahlavi, the last Shah of Iran, ordered four modern general purpose destroyers from the United States and eight modified s from Royal Schelde, but both contracts were canceled after the 1979 Iranian revolution.

Following this was the US-led arms embargo on Iran and the Iran–Iraq War, in which the IRIN played a role. The arms embargo restricted Iran's ability to maintain and equip its navy. It had to find new sources of armaments. Equipment and weaponry were imported from the Soviet Union, China, North Korea and later, Russia. Iran also established its own domestic armaments industry. This industry has also supported the navy by providing weaponry, equipment and spare parts.

2000–present 
In terms of major surface ships, Iran relies on its s as well as the new s which were indigenously developed in Iran and are reverse engineered Alvand class with modern electronics, radar and armament. Iran's three destroyers are over 50 years old and are kept in material reserve at Bushehr. The navy does not include capital ships; its largest ships are four frigates and three corvettes, all of which are armed with modern anti-ship missiles. The main focus of the IRI Navy seems to be on developing new frigates, corvettes and medium to large fast boats capable of carrying modern precision anti-ship missiles. Three of four frigates (Vosper Mark 5), however, were commissioned over 25 years ago and these ships have been updated with Chinese C-802 missiles. Iran's three corvettes were commissioned over 30 years ago; one (Hamzeh) was originally a government yacht but has now been armed with C-802 missiles as well, but it is deployed at Anzali on the Caspian Sea.

In July 2016, the Navy said that it would establish a presence in the Atlantic Ocean, of unspecified duration.

In December 2019, the Iranian Navy's head Rear Admiral Hossein Khanzadi acknowledged in a televised interview that the Navy was now dependent on annual joint exercises with Russia and China, and that efforts by other countries to form alliances against Iran in the Persian Gulf were "pointless."

For the first time in its history, the Navy captured two U.S. Navy sea drones in the Red Sea on 6 September 2022.

Equipment

Current ships 

According to 'The Military Balance 2020' of the International Institute of Strategic Studies (IISS), the inventory includes:

Current aircraft 
Based on reports published by Flightglobal Insight and the IISS, as of 2020, Iranian naval aircraft inventory includes:

Former ships

Future ships

Organization

Aviation

Marines

Coastal defence

Facilities
In 1977, the bulk of the fleet was shifted from Khorramshahr to the new headquarters at Bandar-e Abbas. Bushehr was the other main base; smaller facilities were located at Khorramshahr, Khark Island, and Bandar-e Imam Khomeini (formerly known as Bandar-e Shahpur). Bandar-e Anzali (formerly known as Bandar-e Pahlavi) was the major training base and home of the small Caspian Sea fleet, which consisted of a few patrol boats and a minesweeper. The naval base at Bandar Beheshti (formerly known as Chah Bahar) on the Gulf of Oman had been under construction since the late 1970s and in late 1987 still was not completed. Smaller facilities were located near the Strait of Hormuz. Iran also announced that new base is established in the Oman Sea.
 Abu Musa – small docking facility on the island's west end; located near Abu Musa Airport
 Al-Farsiyah
 Bandar Beheshti (Chah Bahar) – port and base facilities in the Gulf of Oman
 Bandar-e Abbas – naval HQ and home to naval airbase
 Bandar-e Anzali – once training base and now home to Caspian Sea Fleet (patrol boats, minesweepers)
 Bandar-e Khomeini – small sheltered base located near the border with Iraq
 Bandar-e Mahshahr – small base located near Bandar-e Khomeini
 Bushehr – repair and storage facility in the Persian Gulf; home to Navy Technical Supply Center and R&D center
 Halul (an oil platform)
 Jask – small base located across from Oman and UAE in southeastern Iran at the mouth of the Straits of Hormuz
 Khark – small base on the island and located northwest of Bushehr
 Khorramshahr – former naval HQ; now repair and shipbuilding facilities
 Larak – small base on the island and near Bandar-e Abbas
 Kharg Island – base in the Straits of Hormuz; home to hovercraft fleet
 Noshahr – not a base, but home to Iman Khomeini University for Naval Science (naval staff college)
 Qeshm – small port facility near Kharg and Bandar-e Abbas
 Shahid Rajaie
 Sirri – island port facility located in the Persian Gulf and across from UAE

Personnel

Commanders

Ranks and insignia

Procurement and deployment of equipment

1970s - 1990s 

Suffering from decaying Western-supplied weapons purchased by the Shah, Tehran has been acquiring new weapons from Russia, China and North Korea. Iran has expanded the capabilities of the naval branch of the IRGC, acquired additional mine warfare capability, and upgraded some of its older surface ships. Iran's exercises have included a growing number of joint and combined arms exercises with the land forces and air force. Iran has also improved its ports and strengthened its air defences, while obtaining some logistic and technical support from states like India and Pakistan.

As far as major new equipment is concerned, Iran has been building up its naval strength by acquiring three Kilo-class submarines from Russia, as well as other equipment, including 10 Houdong fast attack craft from China. Russia and India were reported to be assisting Iran with training and operating its Kilo-class submarines. As regards other requirements, in December 1997, Rear Admiral Mohammad Karim Tavakoli, commander of the First Naval Zone, with HQ at the Persian Gulf port of Bandar Abbas, claimed that the Iranian Navy had completed design work on three multirole corvettes and a small submarine, to be built in Iran.

2000-2010 

In August 2000, Iran announced that it had launched its first domestically produced light submarine or swimmer delivery vehicle, named the Al-Sabiha 15 because of its 15 meters length, in an official ceremony at the Bandar Abbas naval base. In May 2005, Iran navy announced that it had launched its first Ghadir-class midget submarine and on 8 March 2006 announced that it had launched another submarine named Nahang (Persian: whale).

During 2000, the Islamic Republic of Iran Navy Aviation significantly improved its capability by taking delivery, from Russia, of a number of Mi-8 AMT (Mi-171) transport/attack helicopters. Under a contract signed in 1999, Russia agreed to supply 21 Mi-171s to Iran. Delivery was completed in 2001; although the exact number destined for the navy was unknown. In summer 2001, there were indications that Iran would order a further 20 Mi-171s, although as of mid-2004, it was not known if this had occurred.

In November 2002 sources at both Iran's Aerospace Industries Organisation (AIO) and the China Aerospace Science and Industry Corporation (COSIC) confirmed that the two groups were working on common anti-ship missile production and development. The effort, which Iranian sources call Project Noor, covers the short-range C-701 and the long-range C-802 weapons developed by COSIC's China National Precision Machinery Import and Export Co subsidiary. The possibility that a formal collaborative project was under way was first raised in 1998, when Iran displayed an Anti-Ship missile design similar to the  range C-701 shortly after the Chinese system was unveiled.

An AIO spokesperson confirmed that Project Noor involves the C-701. However, officials in the same company describe the weapon as "a long-range, turbojet-powered, sea-skimming Anti-Ship missile," which better fits the  range C-802, and suggests that the co-operation agreement may cover both weapon systems. In early 2004, Iran announced the release of a new cruise missile program named Raad (Thunder). The Raad appears to be a modification of the Chinese HY-2 (CSSC-3) anti-ship missile, one of a series of missiles China developed from the original Soviet-era P21 (SS-N-2C) design.

On 29 September 2003, Iran's domestically produced Sina-class (reverse engineered from the Kaman class) missile boat , equipped with modern anti-ship missiles and modern electronics entered service in the Islamic Republic of Iran Navy. The ship was launched in the Caspian Sea to protect Iran's interests there and was mentioned among the achievements of the Iranian Navy by Rear Admiral Habibollah Sayyari.

On 22 September 2006, Iran announced to have commissioned their second self-made Kaman-class missile boat, . Built in memory of the original Joshan, lost in the Persian Gulf during Operation Praying Mantis on 18 April 1988. According to Iran's Navy commander Admiral Kouchaki, Joshan has a claimed speed of over [3] and "enjoys the world's latest technology, specially with regard to its military, electrical and electronic systems, frame and chassis, and it has the capabilities required for launching powerful missiles."

In 2002, Iran announced it would start the production of its first domestically produced destroyer. By most international standards the ship, the first of the Moudge class, would be considered a light frigate or a corvette. On 24 November 2007 Iran's rear admiral Habibollah Sayyari announced that Iran would launch its first domestically produced destroyer, though internationally rated as a frigate, and an Iranian Ghadir-class submarine. It is said to be a sonar evading stealth submarine. Initially known as Moje, then Moje I, finally Jamaran, appears to be a development of the Alvand class. The Moudge or Moje-class guided missile frigate entered service in 2010. Another frigate in the same class, named Damavand, has been commissioned in the port of Bandar Anzali in the Caspian Sea in 2013. This ship just like the Jamaran has the capability to: carry helicopters, anti-ship missiles, surface-to-air missiles, torpedoes, modern guns and air defence guns. The ship is also equipped with electronic warfare devices. The two mentioned frigates have brought Iran's frigate arsenal from 3 to 5, while two others are being built, to be added to Iran's fleet of warships in the Persian Gulf.

In March 2006, the navy deployed a submarine named Nahang (Whale), with pictures broadcast by state media at the time showing a minisub.

On 22 February 2008, the Iranian Defense Ministry announced that 74 domestically produced "gunboats" (small missile boats) had entered service with the Iranian Navy. The Navy has had reported to have the Hoot supercavitating torpedo and the Thaqeb (missile) in trials or service, though reliable information is scarce.

2010-2020 

Iran's Deputy Navy Commander Captain Mansour Maqsoudlou announced in February 2010 that Iran has begun planning to design, and manufacture domestically built aircraft carriers. The initial designs for building the carriers has been approved as of 2010 and the process of research and the design for the aircraft carrier is currently being looked into by the Iranian government. However, as of August 2013, the Iranian Navy was still in the research and design stages due to lack of government support and funding.

In 2012, Iran overhauled one of the Kilo-class submarines in its possession, IRS Younis. Iran was able to complete this re-haul at Bandar Abbas naval base. In addition the Iranian Navy has modernized and re-commissioned the 1,135-ton s; equipped with Noor anti-ship cruise missiles and torpedo launchers. Another modern frigate named Sahand, with 2,000 tons displacement was being fitted up with weapons and equipment in Bandar Abbas naval base; and was planned for launch in 2013.
 
In July 2012, foreign analysts reported that Iran was gaining new deployment capabilities, allegedly to strike at US warships in the Persian Gulf in the case of an armed conflict, amassing an arsenal of anti-ship missiles while expanding its fleet of fast-attack crafts and submarines. Many of the systems were developed with foreign assistance, such as the anti-ship missiles Silkworm, which is Chinese-made, and high-speed torpedoes based on Russian designs. In weeks prior, Iranian leadership had been threatening to shut down shipping in the gulf region as retaliation for any attacks by the United States on its nuclear facilities.

In December 2014, Iran conducted joint wargames involving the Iranian Army, Air Force and Navy. Naval phase took part on a wide area, ranging from Persian Gulf to northern Indian Ocean and to Gulf of Aden. New systems were tested, including new anti-ship cruise missiles, electro-magnetic and acoustic naval mine-sweeping system and Fateh submarine.

On February 17, 2019, news papers reported that Iran has unveiled domestically produced submarine capable of firing cruise missiles. On November 30, 2019, Iran's navy announced the mass production of the Jask cruise missile, which is launched from Iranian submarines. It also unveiled a vertical takeoff and landing (VTOL) naval drone named Pelican-2, which had already been deployed on "naval fleets in international waters."

Iran's navy deployed two warships to the Gulf of Aden in August 2019 to protect commercial shipping, including the destroyer Sahand and the supply ship/replenishment oiler Kharg. In September 2019, the head of the Iran navy said it was ready to defend its marine borders, and denied US and Saudi claims that Iran had orchestrated recent attacks on Saudi oil sites. On November 20, 2019, Islamic Republic News Agency reported that Iran's navy had sent a fleet of 64 ships to the Gulf of Aden to "safeguard Iran's interests" in an "insecure seafaring region." The month prior, a maritime coalition led by the United States had formally launched operations in the Gulf. The Iran and US navies subsequently encountered each other in the Strait of Hormuz on November 23, 2019, with no conflict.

On December 4, 2019, Khanzadi stated that exercises, called Marine Security Belt, with China and Russia would begin on December 27 in the northern Indian Ocean. On December 30, 2019, Rear Admiral Hossein Khanzadi acknowledged during a televised interview with the semi-official Mehr News Agency that the Iranian Navy conducted joint exercises with Russia and China and will continue to do so on an annual basis. However, Khanzadi also stated that the drills were now needed due to a lack of coordination. He also stated that invitations which invited other countries to participate in the drills were unsuccessful. All participants described the exercise as defensive in nature, with Khanzadi also stating that it was a "highly significant message" to the United States and allies.

See also

 List of navies
 Military history of Iran
 Armed Forces of the Islamic Republic of Iran
 List of military equipment manufactured in Iran
 Defense industry of Iran
 Iranian anti-access and area denial strategy in the Strait of Hormuz
 Indian Ocean Naval Symposium

References

External links